Mary Kay (born Maria Kaimaki) is a Greek landscape photographer. She was the 2011 Digital Camera World Photographer of the Year for the Gardens and Plants category with her work Autumn Interlude.

References

External links
 justeline: Mary Kay at deviantArt.

Year of birth missing (living people)
Place of birth missing (living people)
Greek photographers
Landscape photographers
Greek women photographers
Living people
21st-century women photographers